Longhair, or long hair, is a hairstyle, or a person with such a hairstyle. It may also refer to:

People

 Leung Kwok-hung, also known as "Long Hair", a Hong Kong politician
 Professor Longhair, New Orleans musician
 Long hairs was a nickname of a faction in the Taiping Rebellion.

Cats
 Longhair or Persian Longhair, alternative names of the Persian cat breed
 Domestic long-haired cat, a cat of mixed ancestry
 British Longhair, a breed of cat
 American Longhair, a breed of cat

Other

 Angak, a Hopi kachina
A 1959 episode of the western TV series Yancy Derringer
 A devotee of Classical music